Jezerski vrh may refer to:

 Maja Jezercë, the highest point of the Prokletije and the entire Dinaric Alps
 Seebergsattel, a high mountain pass connecting the Austrian state of Carinthia with the Slovenian region of Carinthia.